Driggers is a surname most often originating in the Southeastern United States. Although the origins are unclear, one proposed explanation comes from a transformation of a branch of the "Rodriguez" surname originating in the Southeastern United States. 

Notable people with the surname include:

Nate Driggers (born 1973), American basketball player
Scott Driggers (born 1962), American handball player

See also
Driggers D1-A, American monoplane
Walt Driggers Field, baseball venue in Texas, United States

References